The Anaktuvuk Pass ("the place of caribou droppings", el. 2,200 ft.) is a mountain pass located in Gates of the Arctic National Park and Preserve in North Slope Borough in northern Alaska. The Anaktuvuk Pass is in the Brooks Range which divides the Anaktuvuk River with the John River.

Anaktuvuk Pass is a village in the pass, the home of the only concentrated population of the Nunamiut, the only true inland Iñupiat group in Alaska.

Climate 
Anaktuvuk Pass has a Polar climate, specifically a tundra climate, but lies within the southern periphery of the climate zone, bearing some characteristics of a cold subarctic climate, but overall being a clear cut tundra climate, with the low precipitation being not much different than that of a desert.   Anaktuvuk Pass also has not seen temperatures rise above freezing during January or February. Summer is defined as the time period when the most precipitation is received, often in the form of rain, hence June through September.  Meanwhile, in the winter, the village receives snowfall but not as much as places further south, such as Fairbanks; however, the snowfall in Anaktuvuk Pass persists much longer into the "spring" season.

Education
The North Slope Borough School District operates the Nunamiut School in Anaktuvuk Pass.

See also
List of Alaska rivers

References

External links
 Anaktuvuk Pass, Alaska

Mountain passes of Alaska
Landforms of North Slope Borough, Alaska
Brooks Range